Prince Gabriel Albert Maria Michael Franz Joseph Gallus Lamoral of Thurn and Taxis (16 October 1922 – 17 December 1942) was a  Prince of Thurn and Taxis. Gabriel was second in the line of succession to the Headship of the House of Thurn and Taxis after his father Franz Joseph, Hereditary Prince of Thurn and Taxis until his death in the Battle of Stalingrad, at which point he was replaced by his uncle Prince Karl August of Thurn and Taxis.

Family
Gabriel was born at Schloss Haus near Regensburg, Bavaria, the eldest child and son of Prince Franz Joseph of Thurn and Taxis (later 9th Prince of Thurn and Taxis) and his wife Princess Isabel Maria of Braganza. His twin sister, Princess Michaela of Thurn and Taxis, died at birth. Gabriel was a paternal grandson of Albert, 8th Prince of Thurn and Taxis and his wife Archduchess Margarethe Klementine of Austria and a maternal grandson of Miguel, Duke of Braganza and his wife Princess Maria Theresa of Löwenstein-Wertheim-Rosenberg.

World War II

During World War II, Gabriel was conscripted for military service before completing high school. He served first as a Gefreiter (Private First Class) and then as an officer in the Wehrmacht. Gabriel was serving in a Reiter-Regiment (Cavalry Regiment) in the Wehrmacht when he was killed in action at the Battle of Stalingrad on 17 December 1942. He was interred among the unknown dead at the war cemetery at Rossoschka.

Ancestry

References

External links
Photograph of Prince Gabriel of Thurn and Taxis

1922 births
1942 deaths
Military personnel from Regensburg
Princes of Thurn und Taxis
German Roman Catholics
German Army personnel killed in World War II
Heirs apparent who never acceded
German twins
German Army officers of World War II